Akagi Station is the name of two train stations in Japan:

 Akagi Station (Gunma) (赤城駅)
 Akagi Station (Nagano)  (赤木駅)